In mathematics, an expression or mathematical expression is a finite combination of symbols that is well-formed according to rules that depend on the context.  Mathematical symbols can designate numbers (constants), variables, operations, functions, brackets, punctuation, and grouping to help determine order of operations and other aspects of logical syntax.

Many authors distinguish an expression from a formula, the former denoting a mathematical object, and the latter denoting a statement about mathematical objects. For example,  is an expression, while  is a formula. However, in modern mathematics, and in particular in computer algebra, formulas are viewed as expressions that can be evaluated to true or false, depending on the values that are given to the variables occurring in the expressions. For example  takes the value false if  is given a value less than –1, and the value true otherwise.

Examples
The use of expressions ranges from the simple:

   (linear polynomial)

   (quadratic polynomial)

   (rational fraction)

to the complex:

Syntax versus semantics

Syntax

An expression is a syntactic construct. It must be well-formed: the allowed operators must have the correct number of inputs in the correct places, the characters that make up these inputs must be valid, have a clear order of operations, etc. Strings of symbols that violate the rules of syntax are not well-formed and are not valid mathematical expressions.

For example, in the usual notation of arithmetic, the expression 1 + 2 × 3 is well-formed, but the following expression is not:

.

Semantics

Semantics is the study of meaning. Formal semantics is about attaching meaning to expressions.

In algebra, an expression may be used to designate a value, which might depend on values assigned to variables occurring in the expression. The determination of this value depends on the semantics attached to the symbols of the expression.  The choice of semantics depends on the context of the expression.  The same syntactic expression 1 + 2 × 3 can have different values (mathematically 7, but also 9), depending on the order of operations implied by the context (See also Operations § Calculators).

The semantic rules may declare that certain expressions do not designate any value (for instance when they involve division by 0); such expressions are said to have an undefined value, but they are well-formed expressions nonetheless. In general the meaning of expressions is not limited to designating values; for instance, an expression might designate a condition, or an equation that is to be solved, or it can be viewed as an object in its own right that can be manipulated according to certain rules. Certain expressions that designate a value simultaneously express a condition that is assumed to hold, for instance those involving the operator  to designate an internal direct sum.

Formal languages and lambda calculus

Formal languages allow formalizing the concept of well-formed expressions.

In the 1930s, a new type of expressions, called lambda expressions, were introduced by Alonzo Church and Stephen Kleene for formalizing functions and their evaluation. They form the basis for lambda calculus, a formal system used in mathematical logic and the theory of programming languages.

The equivalence of two lambda expressions is undecidable. This is also the case for the expressions representing real numbers, which are built from the integers by using the arithmetical operations, the logarithm and the exponential (Richardson's theorem).

Variables
Many mathematical expressions include variables. Any variable can be classified as being either a free variable or a bound variable.

For a given combination of values for the free variables, an expression may be evaluated, although for some combinations of values of the free variables, the value of the expression may be undefined. Thus an expression represents a function whose inputs are the values assigned to the free variables and whose output is the resulting value of the expression.

For example, the expression

evaluated for x = 10, y = 5, will give 2; but it is undefined for y = 0.

The evaluation of an expression is dependent on the definition of the mathematical operators and on the system of values that is its context.

Two expressions are said to be equivalent if, for each combination of values for the free variables, they have the same output, i.e., they represent the same function. Example:

The expression

has free variable x, bound variable n, constants 1, 2, and 3, two occurrences of an implicit multiplication operator, and a summation operator. The expression is equivalent to the simpler expression 12x. The value for x = 3 is 36.

See also

 Algebraic closure
 Algebraic expression
 Analytic expression
 Closed-form expression
 Combinator
 Computer algebra expression
 Defined and undefined
 Equation
 Expression (programming)
 Formal grammar
 Formula
 Functional programming
 Logical expression
 Term (logic)
 Well-defined expression

Notes

References
 

Abstract algebra
Logical expressions
Elementary algebra